The Film Arcade is an independent American film production and distribution company based in Los Angeles.

History
Founded in 2012 by Miranda Bailey, Jason Beck and Andy Bohn, The Film Arcade recently released Mike Birbiglia’s Don’t Think Twice starring Keegan-Michael Key and Gillian Jacobs as well as Josh Mond’s James White starring Christopher Abbott, Cynthia Nixon and Scott "Kid Cudi" Mescudi.  Previous films include Jim Strouse’s People Places Things starring Jemaine Clement, Kris Swanberg's Unexpected starring Cobie Smulders and Anders Holm, Song One starring Anne Hathaway, A.C.O.D. starring Adam Scott, Richard Jenkins, Catherine O'Hara, Clark Duke, Jessica Alba, Jane Lynch and Amy Poehler and Jill Soloway’s Afternoon Delight starring Kathryn Hahn, Juno Temple, Josh Radnor and Jane Lynch.  The Film Arcade recently financed and produced Lake Bell’s I Do...Until I Don't which stars Bell, Ed Helms, Paul Reiser, Mary Steenburgen, Amber Heard, Wyatt Cenac and Dolly Wells. The film will be released in 2017.

The Film Arcade has a home entertainment distribution deal with Universal Pictures and frequently handles theatrical distribution for Paramount and Lionsgate on their "day and date" releases.

Filmography

References

External links 

Official Website

Film production companies of the United States
Film distributors of the United States